Hermann Gerhardt Karl Oncken (16 November 1869 in Oldenburg, Germany – 28 December 1945 in Göttingen, Germany) was a German historian and political writer. He was one of the most notable historians of pre-Nazi Germany.

He lectured at the universities of Chicago (1905), Giessen (1906), Heidelberg (1907–1923), Munich (1923–1928), and Berlin (1928–1935). In 1935 he was forced to retire by the Nazi regime, which he opposed.

He specialized in the 19th century, history of historical thought, history of political thought.

Notable students:
 Franz Schnabel (1887–1966), Ph.D. 1910
 Gerhard Ritter (1888–1967), Ph.D. in 1912
 Ernst Simon (1899–1988), Ph.D. in 1923
 George W. F. Hallgarten (1901–1975), Ph.D. 1925
 Walter Frank (1905–1945), Ph.D. 1927
 Michael Freund (1902–1972), Ph.D. 1928
 Paul Kluke (1908–1990), Ph.D. 1931
 Margret Boveri (1900–1975), Ph.D. 1932
 Felix Hirsch (1902–1982), Ph.D 1924

Selected works
 Lasalle. Zwischen Marx und Bismarck (Lassalle. Between Marx and Bismarck), 1904
 Rudolf von Bennigsen. Ein deutscher liberaler Politiker (Rudolf von Bennigsen. A German liberal politician), 1910
 Historisch-politische Aufsätze (Historical-political Essays), 1914
 Das alte und das neue Mitteleuropa, 1917
 Die Utopia des Thomas Morus und das Machtproblem in der Staatslehre, 1922
 Die Rheinpolitik Kaiser Napoleons III von 1863 bis 1870 (The Rhine policy of Emperor Napoleon III from 1863 until 1870), 3 vol., 1926
 Napoleon III. und der Rhein. Der Ursprung des Krieges von 1870/71 (Napoleon III. and the Rhine. The Origin of the War of 1870/71), 1926 (= separately published Introduction of Die Rheinpolitik Kaiser Napoleons III (The Rhine policy of Emperor Napoleon III))
 Über das Motiv der "Sicherheit" in der europäischen Geschichte, 1926
 Großherzog Friedrich I. von Baden und die deutsche Politik von 1854–1871 (Grand Duke Friedrich I of Baden and the German policy of 1854–1871, 1927
 Das Deutsche Reich und die Vorgeschichte des Weltkrieges (The German Reich and the Origin of the Great War), 2 vol., 1927
 Cromwell. Vier Essays über die Führung einer Nation, 1935
 Nation und Geschichte. Reden und Aufsätze 1919–1935 (Nation and History. Speeches and Essays 1919–1935), 1935

Further reading
Felix E. Hirsch, Hermann Oncken and the End of an Era, The Journal of Modern History, Vol. 18, No. 2 (Jun., 1946), pp. 148–159 (JSTOR)

External links
 

1869 births
1945 deaths
20th-century German historians
Members of the First Chamber of the Diet of the Grand Duchy of Baden
German male non-fiction writers
Members of the Göttingen Academy of Sciences and Humanities